Anna Ewa Tarwacka (born 1978)  is a Polish lawyer, professor of social sciences in the discipline of legal sciences, professor at the Cardinal Stefan Wyszyński University in Warsaw, specialist in the field of Roman law.

She is a law graduate from the University of Warsaw in 2003. In 2020, the President of Poland, Andrzej Duda, awarded her the title of professor of social sciences in the discipline of legal science.

References

External links
 Anna Tarwacka's profile at the nauka-polska.pl

Polish women lawyers
Legal historians
1978 births
Living people
University of Warsaw alumni
Academic staff of Cardinal Stefan Wyszyński University in Warsaw
21st-century Polish lawyers